PQ2 or variation, may refer to:

 Convoy PQ 2, WWII Allied Arctic Convoy
 Persona Q2: New Cinema Labyrinth
 PQ2: Practical Intelligence Quotient 2, video game
 Police Quest II: The Vengeance, video game
 PQ2, a rating used for the UK Royal Mail in Address Point

See also
 PQQ (disambiguation)
 PQ (disambiguation)